Michel Piquemal (born 15 April 1947) is a French choir conductor and conductor. He is also an operatic singer (baritone).

Biography 
Born in Paris, originally from Ariège, his parents were not musicians at all. Michel Piquemal wanted to play the piano and it was a teacher from the city of Paris, Françoise Deslogères, who spoke to his parents about it and, thanks to her, he began to study the piano. When it was necessary to go through 6th class, she was still the one who convinced his parents that he could enter the "Maîtrise de l'ORTF", the already very famous maîtrise. He applied and went in.

Michel Piquemal therefore began his singing studies at the "Maîtrise of the ORTF", which has now become the Maîtrise de Radio France. It is in this lineage that he continued his training with Pierre Bernac (baritone and favourite interpreter of Francis Poulenc), and Denise Duval (a fetish interpreter, qualified as a double-female by Francis Poulenc) for the French melody and finally, at the Mozarteum in Salzburg for the interpretation of the Lied.

In 1987, Michel Piquemal was entrusted with the direction of the Vittoria Choir and the Provence-Alpes-Côte d'Azur Regional Choir.

From 1985 to 1994, he taught at the Conservatoire de Paris.

His discography is rich and diversified. As a baritone, he has recorded works by Liszt, Sauguet, Lalo, Rossini, with the pianist Christine Lajarrige, mélodies by Poulenc. With his various formations, Piquemal made recordings dedicated to Rossini, Mendelssohn, Brahms, Schubert, Cornelius, Donizetti, Gabriel Fauré, Guy Ropartz, Poulenc, Lendvay, Duruflé, Arthur Honegger and Henri Tomasi.

At the head of his vocal ensemble, Michel Piquemal won in 1996 the third  Victoires de la musique classique with the recording devoted to the integral of the sacred music by Maurice Duruflé, published at Naxos Records. A first Victoire de la musique classique followed by a second, this time with the Vittoria Choir, in 1998, for his recording of "David" by Arthur Honegger, released by Naxos again, and for all his achievements. Recognized by his peers, he is always keen to pass on his passion for music and to give new artists the chance to work with him.

After having been Jacques Jouineau's assistant, Michel Piquemal taught singing at the Maîtrise de Radio France, then for nearly ten years at the Conservatoire de Paris until 1994 and at the 18th arrondissement of Paris's Conservatory until 2012. He has trained and accompanied among others: Nora Gubish, Hélène Le Corre, Sophie Marin-Degor, Béatrice Uria-Monzon, Clémentine Margaine and Norah Amsellem.

Piquemal has always sought to discover or rediscover works from the repertoire of forgotten classical music such as the music of Martial Caillebotte, brother of the impressionist painter Gustave Caillebotte, which he himself recorded in the form of two albums, including the Messe solennelle de Pâques, widely acclaimed by critics and for his work as a musician. Indeed, the latter received several awards, among others, the 4 F of Télérama and the 4 # of the Diapason magazine, under the label of the Éditions Hortus. His last Opus is the MisaTango called "Messe à Buenos Aires" by Martin Palmeri.

In parallel to his activities with his choirs and vocal ensemble, Michel Piquemal conducts singing courses, masterclasses or festivals, in order to continue to transmit to an amateur or professional audience, his knowledge of the Direction and Choral Chant, such as the Academy internship at the Music Festival of the Sylvanes Abbey.

Michel Piquemal was made an Officier of the Ordre national du Mérite, Officier des Arts et des Lettres, and Chevalier de la Légion d’Honneur for all of his musical contributions to heritage. He also has received the Hungarian award Pro Artibus.

Choir conductor 
 1987: is entrusted with the management of the Vittoria Choir 
 1989: is entrusted with the management of the Chœur Régional Provence Alpes Côte d'Azur
 1994: is entrusted with the management of the Choir of Sainte-Marie-des-Dames

Discography 
Discs with the Vittoria Choir.

 2017: MisaTango by Martin Palmeri
 2015: Une Journée by Martial Caillebotte
 2012: Messe solennelle de Pâques by Martial Caillebotte
 2008:  by David Alagna
 2004: Missa Solemior, Reges Tharsis, Adoro Te, Sonate à deux, Chant de Pâques, Cortège by Gaston Litaize
 2003: Polyphème by Jean Cras
 1998: Djamileh by Georges Bizet
 1997: David by Arthur Honegger
 1996: L'Enfance du Christ by Hector Berlioz
 1996: Françoise Pollet Airs sacrés français
 1994: Requiem et Lazare by Alfred Bruneau
 1994: Psaume 136, Les Vêpres sonnent, Dimanche, Nocturne, Le Miracle de Saint-Nilas by Joseph-Guy Ropartz
 1992: Stabat Mater, Gloria et Litanies à la vierge noire by Francis Poulenc
 1991: Stabat Mater, Via Crucis et Fantaisie et Fugue by Kamillo Lendvay
 1991 : Requiem, Psaume 129 et Messe brève en l’honneur de Sainte Anne by Joseph-Guy Ropartz
 1990: Le Déluge, La Nuit, La Fille du Timbalier by Camille Saint-Saëns
 1990: Jessye Norman at Notre Dame
 1989: Requiem, Psaume XVIII by Camille Saint-Saëns
 1989: Dernière messe des vivants by François-Xavier Gossec
Discs as Baritone.
 Banalités, FP 107, by Francis Poulenc, Michel Piquemal (baritone) and Christine Lajarrige (piano), Naxos.
 1988: Garden Concerto, Sonate d’église, L'oiseau a vu tout cela, Michel Piquemal (baritone), Jacques Vandeville (oboe), Jean-Patrice Brosse (organ), Ensemble instrumental Jean-Walter Audoli, Jean-Walter Audoli (dir.) - Arion

Discs with the Michel Piquemal vocal ensemble.
 Johannes Brahms (1)
 Johannes Brahms (2)
 Claude Debussy
 Maurice Duruflé
 Jean-Louis Florentz
 Kamillo Lendvay
 Felix Mendelssohn
 Joseph-Guy Ropartz
 Gioacchino Rossini (1)
 Gioacchino Rossini (2)
 Franz Schubert

Distinctions 
 1996: 3rd Victoire de la musique classique for the Naxos recording of Maurice Duruflé's integral sacred music with his vocal ensemble.
 1998: 5th Victoire de la musique classique for the recording of the David by Arthur Honegger, with the Vittoria Choir of Île-de-France
 2001: President of the jury of the 
 Officier of the National Order of Merit
 Officier of the Ordre des Arts et des Lettres
 Chevalier of the Legion of Honour
 Hungarn Prize Pro Artibus.

Documentaries 
 Report on Antenne 2, 8 August 1980, at Vaison-la-Romaine, on the rehearsals of the requiem by Roger Calmel.
 Le Requiem perdu de Henri Tomasi, by Jacques Sapiéga (2001), documentary on the recording of the Requiem pour la Paix by Michel Piquemal, with the Orchestre philharmonique de Marseille, the Chœur Régional PACA and the Chœur départemental des Alpes maritimes.
 The Messe solennelle de Pâques, by Martial Caillebotte (2013), documentary on the recording of the Mass, with the Pasdeloup Orchestra and the Vittoria Choir.
 The Misa Tango by Martín Palmeri (2016), documentary on the recording of the Misa Tango by Michel Piquemal with the Pasdeloup Orchestra, and the Vittoria Choir.

References

External links 
 Michel Piquemal on Classiquenprovence
 Michel Piquemal chef de choeur on Radio Classique
 Ensemble vocal Michel Piquemal website
 Michel Piquemal , direction on choeur-vittoria.fr
 Haydn HobXXII 11 Nelson Messe Missa in angustiis D minor Michel Piquemal Orchestre Lamoureux on YouTube

French choral conductors
French male conductors (music)
French operatic baritones
Singers from Paris
Academic staff of the Conservatoire de Paris
1947 births
Living people
Chevaliers of the Légion d'honneur
Officiers of the Ordre des Arts et des Lettres
Officers of the Ordre national du Mérite
21st-century French conductors (music)
21st-century French male musicians